WNMU (channel 13) is a PBS member television station licensed to Marquette, Michigan, United States, serving the Central and Western Upper Peninsula of Michigan. It is owned by Northern Michigan University alongside NPR member WNMU-FM (90.1). Both outlets share studios at the Edgar L. Harden Learning Resource Center on the university's campus in Marquette; the television station's transmitter is located in Ely Township southwest of Ishpeming.

Overview
WNMU first went on the air in 1972, under call sign WNPB. The call signs of WNPB and what had been WNMR-FM were changed to WNMU in December 1975, two weeks apart.

WNMU serves all communities in the UP, over the air on channel 13 in the central UP, and on cable regionwide, including portions of northern Wisconsin not served by PBS Wisconsin stations WPNE-TV or WLEF-TV.

It is also seen on Charter Spectrum cable in Sault Ste. Marie, Michigan, instead of WCMU-TV, which the rest of the market receives via transmitters throughout the Northern Lower Peninsula of Michigan. In most of the Eastern UP, cable or satellite are required to receive any PBS service; when the digital conversion took place in 2009, the Eastern UP lost terrestrial PBS service when WCMU satellite WCML in Alpena lowered its transmitter power for its digital broadcasts. Neither WCMU nor WNMU currently have plans to expand into the Eastern UP to fill the void left by the departure of WCML from the Eastern UP airwaves.

WNMU was part of the Shaw line-up on its Sault Ste. Marie, Ontario, system until 2002, when it was replaced with Detroit's WTVS.

The transmitter for WNMU-TV is located just outside Ishpeming in Ely Township.

The future of WNMU radio and TV was threatened in recent years, as budget cuts led to a proposed sale or closure of the stations. However, new funding was approved, keeping the station on the air.

Programming
WNMU produces a number of shows directly from their studios.
 High School Bowl, hosted by Jim Koski
 Media Meet, a weekly public affairs program focused on issues important to residents of Michigan's Upper Peninsula
 Ask The..., a live call-in series hosted by a panel of experts where viewers may call and have their question discussed on air. There are several shows including Ask The Doctors, Ask The DNR, Ask The Lawyers, and more.
 What's Up?, a brief community calendar interview program.
 Public Eye News, a 15-minute news broadcast run by students at NMU.

In 2012 a broadcast titled Mauvais Sort: Spellbound won a Good News Award for uplifting and excellent journalism.

Technical information

Subchannels
The station's digital signal is multiplexed:

Analog-to-digital conversion
WNMU discontinued regular programming on its analog signal, over VHF channel 13, on June 12, 2009, the official date in which full-power television stations in the United States transitioned from analog to digital broadcasts under federal mandate. The station's digital signal relocated from its pre-transition UHF channel 33 to VHF channel 13.

References

External links
WNMU-TV

PBS member stations
Television channels and stations established in 1972
Northern Michigan University
NMU (TV)
1972 establishments in Michigan